Lixomorphus is a genus of cylindrical weevils belonging to the family Curculionidae. This genus is present in most of Europe and in North Africa.

Species 
 Lixomorphus algirus (Herbst, 1795)

References 

Lixinae